Robert Richardson Banks (1812 – 14 December 1872) was a notable English architect of the mid 19th century who worked for many years in partnership with Charles Barry.

Banks was a pupil of William Atkinson before he joined the practice of Barry's father, Sir Charles Barry.

Partnership

The Banks and Barry Partnership was established in 1847 when Charles junior left his father's practice with Banks, then senior assistant in the practice. For a time (1855–64), the partnership was based at 27 Sackville Street, London. The pair managed numerous projects in London and East Anglia. The partnership was dissolved upon Banks's death in 1872. Sir Aston Webb was a pupil in the practice from 1866 to 1871.

Notable projects

The Cliff Town Estate, Southend, Essex
Bylaugh Hall, Norfolk (1849-1852)
The forecourt of Burlington House (home of the Royal Academy), in Piccadilly, including the apartments of the Geological Society of London (1869–73)
12 Kensington Palace Gardens, London 
Pumphouse/shelter in the Italian Garden, Kensington Gardens, London

References

1812 births
1872 deaths
19th-century English architects